, literal English title: Yataro’s Travel Hat, is a 1957 color Japanese film directed by Kazuo Mori.

Cast 
 Raizo Ichikawa as Yatarō
 Michiyo Kogure as Okichi
 Saburo Date

See also 
 Kasa (hat)

References

External links 
  http://www.raizofan.net/link4/movie2/yataro.htm
 

1957 films
Films directed by Kazuo Mori
Daiei Film films
Films scored by Ichirō Saitō
1950s Japanese films